A public figure is a person who has achieved notoriety, prominence or fame within a society, whether through achievement, luck, action, or in some cases through no purposeful action of their own.

In the context of defamation actions (libel and slander) as well as invasion of privacy, a public figure cannot succeed in a lawsuit on incorrect harmful statements in the United States unless there is proof that the writer or publisher acted with actual malice by knowing the falsity or by reckless disregard for the truth. The legal burden of proof in defamation actions is thus higher in the case of a public figure than in the case of an ordinary person.

Libel laws vary considerably on this matter from jurisdiction to jurisdiction. Even within a cultural grouping, the libel laws of the UK are quite different from those in the US, for example.

United States
The controlling precedent in the United States was set in 1964 by the United States Supreme Court in New York Times Co. v. Sullivan, which is considered a key decision in supporting the First Amendment and freedom of the press.

A fairly high threshold of public activity is necessary to elevate people to a public figure status. Typically, they must either be:
 a public figure, a public official or any other person pervasively involved in public affairs, or
 a limited purpose public figure, those who have "thrust themselves to the forefront of particular public controversies in order to influence the resolution of the issues involved." A "particularized determination" is required to decide whether a person is a limited purpose public figure, which can be variously interpreted:

Discussion of a person on the Internet may at times rise to the level that it causes the subject of discussion to be treated as an involuntary public figure.

Corporations are not automatically treated as public figures, and defamation claims made by corporations are evaluated under the same standard as those made by individuals.

See also 

 Gertz v. Robert Welch, Inc. (1974)
 Curtis Publishing Co. v. Butts (1967)
 Hustler Magazine v. Falwell (1988)

Further reading
 Adams, Kate M. "(Re)defining Public Officials and Public Figures: A Washington State Primer." (Archive) Seattle University Law Review. Seattle University School of Law. Vol 23:1155-2000. p. 1155-1187.

References

American legal terminology
Public sphere